Shamata is a constituency ward of the Ndaragwa Constituency of Kenya's Nyandarua County.

The area is endowed with resources such as the Aberdare National Park and Lake Ol'Bolossat. The lake is known for its hippopotamus population.

Agriculture
In terms of agriculture, it is one of the richest and most productive areas in Kenya. It is known for the production of potatoes, milk, cabbages, peas and pyrethrum in the past.

Education
Schools in the area include Shamata girls high school, Kaheho mixed day secondary school, Lake Olbolosat secondary school that reached the final of the Kenya National Secondary Schools games in 2018 and the semi finals in 2019, Horizon Hope Academy, Lake View Academy, Mwihang'ia primary school, Itonyero primary school, Simbara primary and secondary schools, Warukira primary school, and others.

Tourism
The area is a tourism hub as it is surrounded by the great Aberdare ranges on one side and Lake Ol'Bolossat on the other. The Aberdare ranges have a variety of animals including the "big five": elephant, lion, leopard, rhinoceros, and buffalo, as well as the cheetah and giraffes. Lake Ol'Bolossat has hippos and unusual birds.

References

Geography of Kenya
Nyandarua County